Christian Anthony Keeling (born June 1, 1998) is an American basketball player for the Kataja Basket of the Korisliiga. He played college basketball for the Charleston Southern Buccaneers and the North Carolina Tar Heels.

College career

Charleston Southern
As a freshman, Keeling appeared in 31 games, starting 28 of them. He was named to the Big South All-Freshman Team and was named Big South Freshman of the Week seven times throughout the course of the season. After a successful year as a sophomore, Keeling was named Second Team All-Big South and became the fifth player in league history to score 1,000 points as a sophomore. After a successful junior season for Charleston Southern in which he averaged 18.7 points per game, Keeling announced he was transferring to North Carolina as a graduate transfer.

North Carolina
Keeling became a starting guard at North Carolina as a senior. He scored  nine points on 4-of-13 shooting in his first two games as a Tar Heel. As a senior, Keeling averaged 6.4 points and 2.8 rebounds per game.

Professional career
Keeling joined PrimeTime Players in The Basketball Tournament 2020. He scored 25 points and had five rebounds in the 76–74 opening-round loss to Team CP3.

On December 23, 2020, Keeling signed with the Glasgow Rocks of the British Basketball League. He scored 26 points in his debut with the team four days later.

Career statistics

College

|-
| style="text-align:left;"| 2016–17
| style="text-align:left;"| Charleston Southern
| 31 || 28 || 31.2 || .458 || .342 || .781 || 7.1 || 1.4 || .9 || .3 || 17.3
|-
| style="text-align:left;"| 2017–18
| style="text-align:left;"| Charleston Southern
| 28 || 24 || 33.6 || .426 || .315 || .793 || 5.2 || 2.0 || 1.3 || .4 || 17.6
|-
| style="text-align:left;"| 2018–19
| style="text-align:left;"| Charleston Southern
|  34 || 27 || 32.2 ||  .465 || .380 || .778 || 6.9 || 2.8 || 1.3 || .7 || 18.7
|-
| style="text-align:left;"| 2019–20
| style="text-align:left;"| North Carolina
| 33 || 9 || 19.2 || .428 || .320 || .750 || 2.8 || .6 || .5 || .2 || 6.4
|- class="sortbottom"
| style="text-align:center;" colspan="2"| Career
| 126 || 88 || 28.9 || .447 || .349 || .781 || 5.5 || 1.7 || 1 || .4 || 14.9

Professional

|-
| style="text-align:left;"| 2020–21
| style="text-align:left;"| Glasgow Rocks
| 20 || 19 || 34.0 || .439 || .330 || .839 || 5.5 || 2.9 || 1.0 || .2 || 17.0
|-
|- class="sortbottom"
| style="text-align:center;" colspan="2"| Career
| 20 || 19 || 34.0 || .439 || .330 || .839 || 5.5 || 2.9 || 1.0 || .2 || 17.0

Personal life
Keeling's mother Deirdre died of stomach cancer during his junior year in high school. She worked three jobs to support the family. His father Curtis is an assistant coach at Mt. Eden High School, after previously serving as head coach.

References

External links
North Carolina Tar Heels bio
Charleston Southern Buccaneers bio

1998 births
Living people
American expatriate basketball people in the United Kingdom
American expatriate sportspeople in Scotland
American men's basketball players
Basketball players from Augusta, Georgia
Charleston Southern Buccaneers men's basketball players
Glasgow Rocks players
North Carolina Tar Heels men's basketball players
Shooting guards
African-American basketball players
21st-century African-American sportspeople
American expatriate basketball people in Finland
British Basketball League players